Richard Crese (fl. 1415–1420) of Exeter, Devon, was an English politician.

Family
He was married to Alice.

Career
He was a Member (MP) of the Parliament of England for Exeter in 1415 and 1420.

References

14th-century births
15th-century deaths
English MPs 1415
Members of the Parliament of England (pre-1707) for Exeter
English MPs 1420